The 2018 Hyderabad Open (officially known as the IDBI Federal Life Insurance Hyderabad Open 2018 for sponsorship reasons) was a badminton tournament which took place at G. M. C. Balayogi SATS Indoor Stadium in Hyderabad, India from 4 to 9 September 2018 and had a total purse of $75,000.

Tournament
The 2018 Hyderabad Open was the seventh Super 100 tournament of the 2018 BWF World Tour and also part of the Hyderabad Open championships, which was held for the first time. This tournament was organized by the Badminton Association of India with the sanction from the BWF.

Venue
This international tournament was held at G. M. C. Balayogi SATS Indoor Stadium in Hyderabad, Telangana, India.

Point distribution
Below is the point distribution table for each phase of the tournament based on the BWF points system for the BWF Tour Super 100 event.

Prize money
The total prize money for this tournament was US$75,000. Distribution of prize money was in accordance with BWF regulations.

Men's singles

Seeds

 Sameer Verma (champion)
 B. Sai Praneeth (second round)
 Misha Zilberman (second round)
 Parupalli Kashyap (second round)
 Sourabh Verma (third round)
 Panji Ahmad Maulana (second round)
 Firman Abdul Kholik (semi-finals)
 Heo Kwang-hee (quarter-finals)

Finals

Top half

Section 1

Section 2

Bottom half

Section 3

Section 4

Women's singles

Seeds

 Dinar Dyah Ayustine (second round)
 Lyanny Alessandra Mainaky (first round)
 Brittney Tam (second round)
 Deng Xuan (final)
 Sri Krishna Priya Kudaravalli (quarter-finals)
 Ruselli Hartawan (second round) 
 Ruthvika Shivani Gadde (first round)
 Mugdha Agrey (first round)

Finals

Top half

Section 1

Section 2

Bottom half

Section 3

Section 4

Men's doubles

Seeds

 Satwiksairaj Rankireddy / Chirag Shetty (champions)
 Arjun M.R. / Ramchandran Shlok (quarter-finals)
 Akbar Bintang Cahyono / Muhammad Reza Pahlevi Isfahani (final)
 Arun George / Sanyam Shukla (semi-finals)
 Mohamad Arif Abdul Latif / Nur Mohd Azriyn Ayub (semi-finals)
 Tarun Kona /  Lim Khim Wah (quarter-finals)
 M. Anilkumar Raju / Venkat Gaurav Prasad (first round)
 Pakin Kuna-Anuvit / Natthapat Trinkajee (quarter-finals)

Finals

Top half

Section 1

Section 2

Bottom half

Section 3

Section 4

Women's doubles

Seeds

 Ashwini Ponnappa / N. Sikki Reddy (withdrew)
 Meghana Jakkampudi / Poorvisha S. Ram (second round)
 Agatha Imanuella / Siti Fadia Silva Ramadhanti (semi-finals)
 Ng Wing Yung / Yeung Nga Ting (second round)
 Ng Tsz Yau / Yuen Sin Ying (champions)
 Yulfira Barkah / Jauza Fadhila Sugiarto (semi-finals)
 Aparna Balan / Sruthi K. P. (second round)
 Harika Veludurthi / Karishma Wadkar  (first round)

Finals

Top half

Section 1

Section 2

Bottom half

Section 3

Section 4

Mixed doubles

Seeds

 Pranav Chopra / N. Sikki Reddy (final)
 Satwiksairaj Rankireddy / Ashwini Ponnappa (withdrew)
 Rohan Kapoor / Kuhoo Garg (first round) 
 Saurabh Sharma / Anoushka Parikh (first round)
 Chang Tak Ching / Ng Wing Yung (semi-finals)
 Akbar Bintang Cahyono / Winny Oktavina Kandow (champions)
 Shivam Sharma / Poorvisha S. Ram (second round)
 Vinay Kumar Singh / Anamika Kashyap (withdrew)

Finals

Top half

Section 1

Section 2

Bottom half

Section 3

Section 4

References

External links
 Tournament Link

Hyderabad Open (badminton)
Hyderabad Open (badminton)
Hyderabad Open (badminton)
Hyderabad Open (badminton)